Maharaja Sris Chandra College, established in 1964,  is an undergraduate afternoon/ evening college in Kolkata, West Bengal, India. It offers undergraduate courses in arts and commerce. It is affiliated with the University of Calcutta. It shares premises with Maharaja Manindra Chandra College (day college) and Maharani Kasiswari College (morning college).

Departments

Arts and Commerce

Bengali
English
Hindi
History
Geography
Political Science
Education
Economics
Commerce

Accreditation
In 2016 the college has been awarded B grade by the National Assessment and Accreditation Council. Maharaja Sris Chandra College is recognized by the University Grants Commission (UGC).

See also 
List of colleges affiliated to the University of Calcutta
Education in India
Education in West Bengal

References

External links

Educational institutions established in 1964
University of Calcutta affiliates
Universities and colleges in Kolkata
1964 establishments in West Bengal